Jordi Nopca (born 1983, in Barcelona) is a Spanish journalist, writer and translator. He is a current editor of Ara newspaper and the editor-in-chief of Ara Llegim.

Biography 
Jordi Nopca studied Journalism and Literary theory and Comparative literature. Since 2006 he has published articles for Mondosonoro, Benzina, Sortim, Què fem?, Go Mag and Time Out Barcelona.

In 2012 he published his first novel, entitled El talent, with the publishing house Labreu Edicions. It narrates the experiences of a young couple who travels to Lisbon with a stolen prototype that can detect litarari talent. Thanks to this invention they are able to discover the hidden talent of several people, publish their work and earn a living. According to the author, the novel "should be placed before the crisis, that has led to a gradual dismantling of illusions, so this novel is pre-illusions lost".

The literary critic Julià Guillamon states in La Vanguardia that "his first novel is a wise foolish, full of references to ancient and modern authors, classics and fashion books, which are mixed in an rough history". According to Guillamon, "the flair of the novel is that it makes you slide very quickly, by dint of wit, hilarious dialogues and impossible narrative situations".

In 2013 he received the II Memorial Pere Rodeja, awarded by Catalan Association of Booksellers, for "offering to the readers a broad view, innovative and complete of the literary reality of our country".

Published work 
 El talent, novel (Labreu Edicions, 2012)
 Puja a casa, short-story collection (L'Altra, 2015) / Vente a casa (Libros del Asteroide, 2015) / Come on up (Bellevue Literary Press, 2021)
La teva ombra, novel (Proa, 2019) / En la sombra (Destino, 2020)

Translations 
 William Keepers Maxwell, Jr., They Came Like Swallows as Van venir com orenetes (Libros del Asteroide, 2007)
 Jetta Carleton, The Moonflower Vine as Quatre germanes (Libros del Asteroide, 2009)
 David Monteagudo, Fin as Fi (Quaderns Crema, 2010)
 David Monteagudo, Marcos Montes (Quaderns Crema, 2010)
 Szilárd Borbély, foreword in the novel The dispossessed (Els desposseïts, Edicions del Periscopi, 2015)
 Les Murray, Killing the black dog as Matar el gos negre (Días Contados, 2017)
Fyodor M. Dostoevsky, foreword in Notes from Underground (Apunts del subsòl, Angle Editorial, 2021)
Gunnhild Oyehaug, foreword in Knots (Nusos, Nits Blanques/Las afueras, 2021)

References

External links 
 Jordi Nopca Blog 
 Jordi Nopca at Traces.uab.cat 
 Jordi Nopca articles to Ara newspaper 
 Jordi Nopca – Iu Forn, Via llibre, Televisió de Catalunya 

Journalists from Catalonia
Literary critics from Catalonia
Novelists from Catalonia
21st-century novelists
Writers from Barcelona
Catalan-language writers
Translators from Catalonia
English–Catalan translators
Translators from Spanish
1983 births
Living people
21st-century translators
Male novelists
21st-century male writers